Chenault House may refer to:

in the United States (by state then town)
 Chenault House (Richmond, Kentucky), listed on the National Register of Historic Places (NRHP) in Madison County
 Chenault House (Star Mills, Kentucky), listed on the NRHP in Hardin County,
 Brown-Chenault House, Castalian Springs, Tennessee, listed on the NRHP in Sumner County

See also
Chennault House (disambiguation)